The Glasgow Face Matching Test (GFMT) was created by researchers at the University of Glasgow and at Glasgow Caledonian University. It is a cognitive test designed to determine a person's ability to match different images of unfamiliar faces, and is designed for use in academic research and in applied security settings, where reliable human performance on this task is a common requirement of identity management systems. 

The test was created using a database of photographs, taken of a demographically heterogeneous sample of 300 people. Images of the individuals were captured in a fifteen-minute session on two digital cameras (one video, one still). Similar individuals were paired to make 'different' pairs and 'same' pairs were made by pairing images from the two different cameras. All images used were high quality, with the subject standing face on and looking straight at the camera lens, which was positioned at head height.

There are two versions of the test, one short version comprising 40 "same-or-different" 2AFC decisions and another longer version with 164 decisions. These tests, complete with normative data, are accessible via the journal article referenced below.

See also
 Super recognisers

References

Face recognition